Berca is a commune located in the hillside of Buzău County, Muntenia, Romania, in the valley of the river Buzău. It is an oil and natural gas extraction location.

The commune is composed of thirteen villages: Băceni, Berca, Cojanu, Joseni, Mânăstirea Rătești, Pâclele, Pleșcoi, Pleșești, Rătești, Sătuc, Tâțârligu, Valea Nucului and Viforâta.

Landmarks

The Mud Volcanoes

The Berca Muddy Volcanoes geological and botanical reservation lies in the hills that surround the commune, near the Pâclele village. Mud volcanos, a rare geological phenomenon, occurs there when mud and gas are  expelled from a depth of 3 km through structures resembling real miniature volcanoes.

Rătești monastery

Rătești Monastery is a medieval monastery, attested by documents from the 17th century. It is an Eastern orthodox monastery of nuns, and hosts a museum exhibiting religious books and items.

Demographics
The Romanian census of 2002 reported a population of 9,602 for the Berca commune, making it one of the largest communes in the county. 99% of the inhabitants are ethnic Romanians.

Natives
George Macovescu

Pleșcoi
Pleșcoi village is famous for its meat processing tradition. The Pleșcoi sausages are smoked mutton sausages with chili peppers and garlic. The name Pleșcoi sausages is a protected designation of origin in the European Union.

References

Berca
Localities in Muntenia